Manu Juhani Tamminen (born May 26, 1950) is a Finnish retired professional ice hockey player who played in the SM-liiga and World Hockey Association. He played for TPS, HJK, HIFK, Cleveland Crusaders, and Phoenix Roadrunners. He represented Finland at the 1976 Canada Cup. He was inducted into the Finnish Hockey Hall of Fame in 1991.

Tamminen's post playing career has included coaching in Finland, Sweden, Switzerland and Japan, as well as various television sports commentator positions. Tamminen has also coached Switzerland's and France's national ice hockey A-group.

Coaching career
 TPS 1985–1988, SM-liiga. Rankings: Fourth, Fourth and Fifth.
 HC Sierre 1988–1990, On the Swiss B-series.
 HC Sierre 1990–1991, On the Swiss A-series. Ranking 9/10.
 Switzerland men's B-national ice hockey team 1989–1990.
 Switzerland men's national ice hockey team 1991–1992.
 IF Sundsvall Hockey/Timrå IK 1992–1993, "North Fortsättningsserien" (The third highest league in Sweden).
 TUTO Hockey, I-Divisioona 1993–1994 (the team rose at the end of the season in to SM-liiga).
 France men's national ice hockey team 1994–1997.
 Ässät, SM-liiga 1997–1998.
 Oulun Kärpät 1998–2000, I-Divisioona.the Kärpät won the Pelicans in qualifying games at the end of the 1999–2000 season and went to the SM-Liiga for the 2000–2001.
 Oulun Kärpät 2000–2001, SM-liiga. Released during the middle of the season.
 Not coached 2001–2003 (He served as Managing Director of Ässät).
 Vaasan Sport 2004–2005, Mestis. During the 2004–2005 season, Sport lost the Mestis finals to KalPa with a 0–3 defeat. During the 2005–2006 season, Tamminen resigned in December and moved to Switzerland.
 Zürich Lions 2005–2006, National League (ice hockey) (released from missions during the qualifying Relegation).
 Vaasan Sport 2007–2010, Mestis. Replaced coach Mikko Manner in December 2007. Tamminen was left on sick leave due to a burnout at the end of January 2010.
 TUTO Hockey, Mestis 2012–2013.

References

External links
 Finnish Hockey Hall of Fame bio
 

1950 births
Living people
Cleveland Crusaders players
Finnish expatriate sportspeople in Japan
Finnish ice hockey left wingers
HIFK (ice hockey) players
Ice hockey players at the 1972 Winter Olympics
Kokudo Keikaku players
Oklahoma City Blazers (1965–1977) players
Olympic ice hockey players of Finland
Phoenix Roadrunners (WHA) players
Sportspeople from Turku
HC TPS players
Ässät coaches
Finnish expatriate ice hockey coaches
Finnish expatriate ice hockey players in the United States
Finnish expatriate ice hockey people in Sweden
Finnish expatriate ice hockey people in Switzerland
Finnish expatriate ice hockey people in France